Frog Hollow may refer to:

 an alternative name of Wurrenranginy Community, Western Australia
 Frog Hollow (Hartford, Connecticut), a city neighborhood
 a community of Elizabeth, New Jersey, United States